Nebojša Pejić (born 5 January 1988) is a Bosnian-Herzegovinian footballer playing with FK Rudar Prijedor in the Bosnian Premier League.

Club career
Born in Zenica (SR Bosnia and Herzegovina, SFR Yugoslavia), Nebojša Pejić begin playing in the youth team of OFK Beograd.  His senior career started in 2006 in a local club from the suburbs of Belgrade named FK BSK Borča.  The club was playing in the Serbian First League until 2009 when it won promotion to the Serbian SuperLiga.  He made a total of 76 league appearances (29 of which in the SuperLiga) before leaving the club in summer 2011.  He moved to Bosnia and Herzegovina, a country he represented internationally, and joined FK Sloga Doboj, a club playing in the First League of Republika Srpska, a second Bosnian tier.  However, by the end of 2011 he was making his debut for the Bosnian national team, and moving to a top level side FK Kozara Gradiška.

First played for the Bosnian under-17 side, and afterwards he represented Bosnian under-21 team before appearing for an unofficial Bosnia and Herzegovina selection on 16 December 2011, in a friendly match against Poland.

After moving to Australia, Pejić signed for Serbian-backed National Premier Leagues Victoria club Springvale White Eagles FC in January 2017  where he also Coached his first year in Australia as U12's Head Coach for Springvale White Eagles FC, as well he undertook a position with Futbal First Academy based at Forest Hill College.

Honours
BSK Borča
Serbian First League: 2008–09

References

External sources
 Nebojša Pejić Stats Statistics from Serbian Super League

1988 births
Living people
Sportspeople from Zenica
Serbs of Bosnia and Herzegovina
Association football midfielders
Bosnia and Herzegovina footballers
Bosnia and Herzegovina youth international footballers
Bosnia and Herzegovina under-21 international footballers
FK BSK Borča players
FK Sloga Doboj players
FK Kozara Gradiška players
FK Rudar Prijedor players
NK Čelik Zenica players
Springvale White Eagles FC players
Serbian SuperLiga players
First League of the Republika Srpska players
Premier League of Bosnia and Herzegovina players
National Premier Leagues players
Bosnia and Herzegovina expatriate footballers
Expatriate footballers in Serbia
Bosnia and Herzegovina expatriate sportspeople in Serbia
Expatriate soccer players in Australia